Jiří Džmura (born April 8, 1963 in Jablonec nad Nisou) is a Czechoslovakian-Czech bobsledder who competed from the early 1990s to 2005. Competing in two Winter Olympics, he earned his best finish of seventh in the two-man event (tied with Canada) at Lillehammer in 1994.

Džmura would later compete for the Czech Republic in bobsleigh before retiring in 2005. He now lives in Monte Carlo.

References
1992 bobsleigh two-man results
1992 bobsleigh four-man results
1994 bobsleigh two-man results
1994 bobsleigh four-man results
FIBT profile
Radio.cz interview with Džurma prior to the 2006 Winter Olympics 

1963 births
Sportspeople from Jablonec nad Nisou
Bobsledders at the 1992 Winter Olympics
Bobsledders at the 1994 Winter Olympics
Bobsledders at the 1998 Winter Olympics
Czech male bobsledders
Czechoslovak male bobsledders
Living people
Olympic bobsledders of Czechoslovakia
Olympic bobsledders of the Czech Republic